Vasco Sousa (born 10 March 1964) is a Portuguese swimmer. He competed in the men's 4 × 100 metre freestyle relay at the 1988 Summer Olympics.

References

External links
 

1964 births
Living people
Portuguese male swimmers
Olympic swimmers of Portugal
Swimmers at the 1988 Summer Olympics
Place of birth missing (living people)
Portuguese male freestyle swimmers